Apple Springs is a small unincorporated community in Trinity County, Texas, United States.  The town was founded shortly after the Civil War as May Apple Springs.  The town rose to a population of 285 in 1965, and then progressively declined to about 130 people, with nine business, in the 1990s.

Schools
Apple Springs is home to Apple Springs Independent School District.  The district has two schools, Apple Springs Elementary School (pre-kindergarten to grade 6) and Apple Springs High School (grades 7 to 12), with approximately 140-165 students. In 2004-2005, the school district received an "Academically Acceptable" rating from the Texas Education Agency (TEA). In 2002, Apple Springs High School was recognized by Texas Monthly one of the top ten high schools in Texas in its economic group, based on ranking by the National Center for Educational Accountability.

History
A post office has been in operation at Apple Springs since 1884. The community took its name from a nearby spring where May apples grew.

References

Apple Springs Independent School District, GreatSchools.net.
Texas House District 12 School Districts Report
2005 Accountability System,  TEA report on school district performance.
School Web Page, School Web Page
"Our Best High Schools: The top performers in Texas", Texas Monthly, November 2002.
Rising from the Ashes

Unincorporated communities in Texas
Unincorporated communities in Trinity County, Texas